All Saints’ Church, Gravelly Hill is a parish church in the Church of England in Birmingham.

History
The church was built between 1900 and 1901 to designs by the architect V.S. Peel, as a chapel of ease to St Barnabas' Church, Erdington. It was enlarged in 1918 by William Bidlake.

In 1928 the church was consecrated, and in 1929 a parish was assigned out of St Barnabas' Church, Erdington and St Peter and St Paul's Church, Aston.

In 1934, part of the parish was taken to form a new parish for St Mark's Church, Stockland Green.

References

Church of England church buildings in Birmingham, West Midlands
Churches completed in 1901
20th-century Church of England church buildings